Philip Awadalla is a professor of medical and population genetics at the Ontario Institute for Cancer Research, and the Department of Molecular Genetics, Faculty of Medicine, University of Toronto. He is the National Scientific Director of the Canadian Partnership for Tomorrow's Health (CanPath), formerly the Canadian Partnership for Tomorrow Project (CPTP), and Executive Director of the Ontario Health Study.  He is also the Executive Scientific Director of the Genome Canada Genome Technology Platform, the Canadian Data Integration Centre. Professor Awadalla was the Executive Scientific Director of the CARTaGENE biobank, a regional cohort member of the CPTP, from 2009 to 2015, and is currently a scientific advisor for this and other scientific and industry platforms. At the OICR, he is Director of Computational Biology.

Career 
Philip Awadalla completed his Ph.D at the University of Edinburgh, Scotland under the supervision of Deborah Charlesworth in 2001. He then completed a Killam Trust Fellowship and Wellcome Trust postdoctoral fellowships under the supervision of Sarah Otto at the University of British Columbia (2001) and Charles Langley at the University of California, Davis  (US) (2001-2003).

In 2004, Awadalla was appointed as  assistant professor at the Department of Genetics and Centre for Bioinformatics (led by Bruce Weir) at North Carolina State University. His work there included identifying potential genetic targets for vaccines to Plasmodium falciparum, the main malaria parasite. This has included the first genetic maps and mapping of drug resistance genes in malaria.

In 2007 Awadalla, he became an associate professor in the department of pediatrics at the  Université de Montréal, and in 2009 he became the Executive Scientific Director of the CARTaGENE Biobank of Québec. His research focused on developing next-generation genomics platforms to support to pediatric disease research and discovery of rare mutations.   Awadalla discovered the relationship of a histone methylating factor encoded by the gene PRDM9 and child-hood acute lymphoblastic leukemia.

Research by Awadalla (with Matthew Hurles of the Wellcome Trust Sanger Institute) was first to directly estimate the number of mutations passed on by individual parents to human offspring, fewer than was previously estimated. Other discoveries include large scale RNA methylation and its genetic control in human mitochondria and the impact of population size on negative selection in humans. The Awadalla team were also the first to show the impact of air pollution on gene expression and disease among thousands of individuals in the Quebec population.

Awadalla is part of a number of collaborative programmes, including the analysis and functional analysis groups of the 1000 Genomes Project and the Pan Cancer Analysis of Whole Genomes Program.

References

External links 
OICR official investigator page 
Lab web site

1969 births
Living people
Canadian geneticists
University of Toronto alumni
Alumni of the University of Edinburgh
Academic staff of the University of Toronto